Fusion Asset Management LLP is an asset management firm based in central London specialising in managing volatility risks and risk hedging. Established in 2004 by Kirill Ilinski, a former JP Morgan trader, Fusion nowadays is a group of companies managing around £1 billion across a variety of volatility-related funds and advisory services.

History

Fusion Asset Management was established in 2004 by a former JP Morgan trader and the head of derivatives desk Kirill Ilinski, and former Goldman Sachs fixed income specialists Tim Goodale and John Brewer, to manage portfolios focusing on quantitative methods and risk management. The firm's starting fund, Fusion Credit Relative Value Fund, was one of the first quantitative credit funds in Europe. In 2006 Ilinski set up Fusion Long Volatility Strategy, a protective strategy, which achieved top positions among other multi-strategy funds in the crisis months of 2007-08 and 2010–11 and became the core of the firm's products.

In 2009 Fusion launched its own hedge advisory and started offering exotic option-based low-cost hedges to the financial intermediaries, primarily funds of funds. Fusion's products were aimed against large-scale FX moves' impact on the investor's liquidity. The same year the company announced Fusion Sovereign Yield (Fusion Libor+) strategy. Fusion's option products were the first of its kind in Europe to help corporate clients managing their liquidity while minimising the credit-related costs.

In July 2010 Fusion launched its own long-short volatility hedge fund, Fusion Global Volatility, that grew out of the group's long-only volatility strategy that has been in use since 2007. Although, in 2009 the strategy made 10,3%, the hedge fund made only 7% in 2011. In 2011 Fusion also started offering corporate access to its liquidity hedges aiming to provide a bespoke overlay for the group's FX hedges. Managing volatility risks in Aug 2011 Ilinski's team achieved 16,5% return.

Starting from 2012 Fusion expanded its services to the private clients market now offering wealth management including the access to the products usually available to institutional investors only. In 2015 Fusion obtained a license to manage the pension funds in the United Kingdom and started trading under the name of Loyal North.

See also
Hedge fund

References

External links 

 Investments & Pension Europe, January 2011

Investment management companies of the United Kingdom
Hedge fund firms in the United Kingdom
Companies based in the City of Westminster
Financial services companies established in 2004
Alternative investment management companies